Montdardier is a commune in the Gard department in southern France.

Geography

Climate

Montdardier has a warm-summer Mediterranean climate (Köppen climate classification Csb) closely bordering on a hot-summer Mediterranean climate (Csa).

Population

Sights
The castle in neo-gothic style
La Tude massif
The church

Several quarries above Montdardier were formerly important sources of lithographic limestone.  Stone from these quarries, marketed as Vigan stone, earned an honorable mention in the Great Exhibition of 1851.

See also
Communes of the Gard department
Causse de Blandas

References

Communes of Gard